"Ours" is a song written and recorded by American singer-songwriter Taylor Swift for the deluxe edition of her third studio album, Speak Now (2010). It was released to US country radio as the album's last single on December 5, 2011, by Big Machine Records. Produced by Chad Carlson and Nathan Chapman, "Ours" is an understated country pop ballad with a folk-influenced production. The lyrics depict a young couple's resilience to protect their relationship despite others' scrutiny.

Music critics noted that "Ours" features an understated production as opposed to Swift's previous upbeat singles, and complimented the intricate lyrical details. In the United States, the song peaked at number one on the Hot Country Songs chart and at number 13 on the Billboard Hot 100, and was certified Platinum by the Recording Industry Association of America (RIAA). Internationally, the song charted on the singles charts of Australia, Canada, and the United Kingdom.

The single was supported by a music video directed by Declan Whitebloon featuring Zach Gilford. Swift performed the song live at the 2011 Country Music Association Awards and included it in the concerts of her Speak Now World Tour.

Background and composition
American singer-songwriter Taylor Swift began work on her third studio album, Speak Now (2010), two years prior to its release. "Ours" is a bonus song on the album's deluxe edition, which was available exclusively via Target in the United States. On November 8, 2011, "Ours" was released for download through the US iTunes Store by Big Machine Records. A promotional CD single was released on November 21, 2011; the CD single includes the song and a recorded live performance of "Ours". It was released to US country radio as the album's sixth and final single on December 5, 2011.

Swift wrote "Ours", which was produced by Chad Carlson and Nathan Chapman. The song is a country pop ballad with a folk-influenced production. Compared to other Speak Now tracks, "Ours" features an understated production that highlights Swift's vocals. The lyrics depict a young couple's resilience to protect their relationship despite others' scrutiny. The first line that Swift wrote for the song was, "The stakes are high, the water's rough." The song's couple have experienced the hardships of life and realize, "Life makes love look hard." She tells the boyfriend that she loves him for him, " 'Cause I love the gap between your teeth/ And I love the riddles that you speak/ And any snide remarks from my father about your tattoos/ Will be ignored/ 'Cause my heart is yours," and affirms that she does not care what others think.

Reception
Music critics gave "Ours" generally positive reviews. Billy Dukes of Taste of Country gave the song a four-and-a-half out of five rating and praised the understated production compared to the "shine and polish" of Swift's past singles. Karen Goodner of All Access similarly complimented the folksy and midtempo production. Allen Jacobs of Roughstock claimed "Ours" as Swift's "best single" since "White Horse" (2008). The Arizona Republic Ed Masley complimented the "bittersweet ache" in Swift's vocals and said that the track sounds like what Fleetwood Mac would release. In Rolling Stone, Rob Sheffield favorably compared the song to the Replacements' music and said it is one of his most-repeated among Swift's discography. The lyrics "Don't you worry your pretty little mind / People throw rocks at things that shine" were highlighted by some critics as the song's most memorable.

On a less positive side, Alexis Petridis from The Guardian found the song not as groundbreaking as Swift's other singles, but said it contains "a certain low-key charm". Erin Thompson of Seattle Weekly opined that "Ours" is inferior to "If This Was a Movie", another Speak Now deluxe edition track. Thompson wrote that after a few listens, the former sounds like "a mess of mixed metaphors". Hannah Mylrea from NME dismissed the lyrics as "mawkish" and the production as "sickly sweet".

After its digital release in November 2011, "Ours" debuted at number 13 (which later became its peak) on the US Billboard Hot 100 and number five on the Hot Digital Songs chart, with first-week digital sales of 148,000 copies. It spent 20 weeks in total on the Hot 100. On the Hot Country Songs chart, "Ours" reached number one on the week ending March 31, 2012, becoming Swift's sixth chart topper. The single was certified Platinum by the Recording Industry Association of America (RIAA) for one million digital US copies. As of November 2017, "Ours" had sold 1.5 million copies in the United States. Elsewhere, the song appeared at number 91 on Australia's ARIA Charts, number 68 on Canada's Canadian Hot 100, and at number 181 on the UK Singles Chart.

Live performances and music video
Swift debuted the song live at the 2011 Country Music Association Awards on November 9. She sang an acoustic version and performed in a bright pink sweater on a living room sofa. "Ours" was added to the set lists of some U.S. shows in late 2011, and the Australian shows in 2012, as part of the Speak Now World Tour. In 2012, Swift sang the song as part of a VH1 Storytellers episode taped at Harvey Mudd College in California. Swift performed the song on select dates of her later tour, including the Red Tour (Los Angeles, August 2013) and the Reputation Stadium Tour (Foxborough, Massachusetts, July 2018).

The music video for "Ours" premiered on E! on December 2, 2011. The video was directed by Declan Whitebloom, who had directed the video for Speak Now single "Mean". Swift conceptualized the video's narrative herself. In the video, Swift plays an office worker, donning tennis shoes and messy hair. She engages in mundane daily corporate experience such as riding the bus to work, waiting to drink at the water cooler, and enduring annoying co-workers. As the video approaches the end, Swift's character is excited to leave work and meet her boyfriend (portrayed by Zach Gilford). They meet at the airport; the boyfriend appears in military attire.

Much of the video is monotonous until the moment the couple meet; in the Nanaimo Daily News, Leah Collins noted that the part where Swift meets her boyfriend is the video's only "warm and fuzzy thing". Entertainment Weekly Erin Strecker considered the video more adult and realistic than Swift's previous romantic videos, but praised it because it "still captures that butterflies-in-your-stomach, crazy-in-love tone that she is so famous for". The video spent seven weeks at number one on CMT; it also reached number one on Great American Country and Australia's Country Music Channel.

Accolades

Credits and personnel
Credits are adapted from the liner notes of the CD single.

Taylor Swift – lead vocals, songwriter
Brian David Willis – additional engineering
Bryan Sutton – 12-string guitar, ukulele
Chad Carlson – recording, producer
Drew Bollman –  assistant mixing
Emily Mueller – production assistant
Hank Williams – mastering
Jason Campbell – production coordinator
Justin Niebank –  mixing
Matt Rausch – assistant mixing
Nathan Chapman – producer, recording, acoustic guitar, audio programming, Rhodes piano, harmony vocals, additional engineering
Steve Blackmon – assistant mixing
Matt Rausch – background vocals, producer, writer
Tristan Brock-Jones – assistant engineer
Todd Tidwell – assistant engineer
Whitney Sutton – copy coordinator

Charts

Weekly charts

Year-end charts

Certifications

Release history

References

Print source
 

2010 songs
2011 singles
Songs written by Taylor Swift
Taylor Swift songs
Song recordings produced by Nathan Chapman (record producer)
Big Machine Records singles
Country ballads
2010s ballads
Song recordings produced by Taylor Swift
Pop ballads
Country pop songs